Friday Street may refer to several places in the United Kingdom. The use of the word "street" implies these settlements predate the Norman Conquest.

 Friday Street, a hamlet in Surrey
 Friday Street, three hamlets in Suffolk
 Friday Street, Sussex, a suburb of Eastbourne
 Friday Street, London, a road in the City of London